Christopher Abani (born 27 December 1966) is a Nigerian-American and Los Angeles- based author. He says he is part of a new generation of Nigerian writers working to convey to an English-speaking audience the experience of those born and raised in "that troubled African nation".

Biography
Abani was born in Afikpo, Ebonyi State, Nigeria. His father was Igbo, while his mother was of English descent.

Abani published his first novel, Masters of the Board, in 1985 at the age of 16. It was a political thriller, the plot of which was an allegory based on a coup that was carried out in Nigeria just before it was written. He was imprisoned for six months on suspicion of an attempt to overthrow the government. He continued to write after his release from jail, but was imprisoned for one year after the publication of his 1987 novel Sirocco. During this time, he was held at the infamous Kiri Kiri prison, where he was tortured. After he was released from jail this time, he composed several anti-government plays that were performed on the street near government offices for two years. He was imprisoned a third time and was placed on death row. However, his friends had bribed government officials for his release in 1991, and immediately Abani, his mother, and his four siblings moved to the United Kingdom, living there until 1999. He then moved to the United States, where he now lives.

Education and career
Abani holds a B.A. degree in English and Literary Studies from Imo State University, Nigeria; an M.A. in Gender and Culture from Birkbeck College, University of London, an M.A. in English from the University of Southern California; and a Ph.D. in Creative Writing and Literature from the University of Southern California.

Abani has been awarded a PEN/Barbara Goldsmith Freedom to Write Award, the 2001 Prince Claus Awards, a Lannan Literary Fellowship, a California Book Award, a Hurston-Wright Legacy Award and the Hemingway Foundation/PEN Award. Selections of his poetry appear in the online journal Blackbird. From 2007 to 2012, he was Professor of Creative Writing at the University of California, Riverside. He is currently a Board of Trustees Professor of English at Northwestern University.

His book of poetry, Sanctificum (2010) which was published by Copper Canyon Press, is a sequence of linked poems, bringing together religious ritual, the Igbo language of his Nigerian homeland, and reggae rhythms in a postracial, liturgical love song.

Abani's foray into publishing has led to the formation of the Black Goat poetry series, which is an imprint of New York-based Akashic Books. Poets Kwame Dawes, Christina Garcia, Kate Durbin, Karen Harryman, Uche Nduka, Percival Everett, Khadijah Queen and Gabriela Jauregui have all been published by Black Goat.

Abani's crime novel The Secret History of Las Vegas won the Edgar Award as Best Paperback Original in 2015.

In summer 2016, a broad selection of his works was published in Israel by the small independent publishing house Ra'av under the title Shi'ur Geografia (Hebrew for "Geography Lesson"), edited by Noga Shevach and the poet Eran Tzelgov. The collection received great reviews and offered Hebrew readers a first encounter with the poetry of Abani.

Published works
Novels
Masters of the Board (Delta, 1985)
GraceLand (FSG, 2004/Picador 2005)
The Virgin of Flames (Penguin, 2007)
The Secret History of Las Vegas (Penguin, 2014)

Novellas
Becoming Abigail (Akashic Books, 2006)
Song For Night (Akashic Books, 2007)

Poetry
Kalakuta Republic (Saqi, 2001).
Daphne's Lot (Red Hen Press, 2003)
Dog Woman (Red Hen Press, 2004)
Hands Washing Water (Copper Canyon Press, 2006)
There are no names for red (Red Hen Press, 2010)
Feed me the sun (Peepal Tree Press, 2010)
Sanctificum (Copper Canyon Press, 2010)

Essays
The Face (Restless Books, 2014)

Awards and honors
In 2001, Abani received a Middleton Fellowship from the University of Southern California. In 2003, he received the Lannan Foundation Literary Fellowship, as well as the Hellman/Hammet Grant from Human Rights Watch. 

In 2006, Becoming Abigail was named an Editor's Choice book for The New York Times, and a Critic's Choice for Chicago Reader. It was also a book club selection for Essence Magazine  and Black Expressions.

In 2007, The Virgin of Flames and Song for Night were Editor's Choice picks for The New York Times. The Virgin of Flames was also a Barnes & Noble Discovery Selection, and Becoming Abigail was a New York Libraries Books For Teens Selection.

In 2008, Abani received a Distinguished Humanist Award from the University of California, Riverside.

In 2009, Abani received a Guggenheim Fellow in Fiction.

See also

 List of people from Ebonyi State
 List of TED speakers

References

External links

 
 The Chris Abani Bibliography
 Poems in Blackbird
 Poems in Narrative Magazine
 Biography from the International Literature Festival Berlin
 Chris Abani by Colm Tóibín Bomb
 
 Telling stories from Africa (TEDGlobal 2007)
 On humanity (TED2008)

1966 births
20th-century Nigerian novelists
21st-century Nigerian novelists
21st-century Nigerian poets
Alumni of Birkbeck, University of London
Crime fiction writers
Edgar Award winners
Hemingway Foundation/PEN Award winners
Igbo novelists
Igbo poets
Igbo-language writers
Imo State University alumni
Living people
Nigerian expatriate academics in the United States
Nigerian male novelists
Nigerian male poets
Nigerian people of English descent
Nigerian publishers (people)
Northwestern University faculty
People from Ebonyi State
Prisoners and detainees of Nigeria
University of California, Riverside faculty
University of Southern California alumni